Angaston may refer to:
 Angaston, South Australia, a town on the eastern side of the Barossa Valley in South Australia
 Angaston railway line, a former railway line which terminated in the town
 Angaston railway station, the terminal station on the railway line
 Angaston Power Station, a 50MW diesel-powered electricity generator outside the town
 Angaston Football Club, Australian Rules football club based in the town